The 2011 Indonesia Super League play-off was a football match which was played on Thursday, 23 June 2011, played between Bontang FC (from Bontang), who were ranked 15th in the 2010-11 Indonesia Super League and Persidafon (from Jayapura), ranked 4th.

Persidafon gained promotion to the Indonesia Super League 2011-12 season after beating Bontang FC by a score of 3-2.

Match details

See also
2010–11 Liga Indonesia Premier Division
2010–11 Indonesia Super League

References

External links
ISL Play-off Schedule
ISL Play-off Result

play
playoff

Fachry Husaini